Verna Devlin is a former international lawn bowls competitor for New Zealand.

Bowls career
She won the fours gold medal at the 1973 World Outdoor Bowls Championship in Wellington, New Zealand. She also won the gold medal in the team event (Taylor Trophy).

Devlin won the 1982 singles title and the 1971 pairs title at the New Zealand National Bowls Championships when bowling for the Herne Bay Bowls Club.

Awards
Devlin was inducted into the Bowls New Zealand Hall of Fame in 2013.

References

Date of birth unknown
New Zealand female bowls players
Bowls World Champions
Date of birth missing (living people)